The Choristidae are a small (only eight species in three genera) family of scorpionflies known only from Australia. Their larvae are found in moss mats.

Species
This list is adapted from the World Checklist of extant Mecoptera species: Choristidae and is complete as of 1997.

 Chorista Klug, 1838
 Chorista australis Klug, 1838
 Chorista luteola (Westwood, 1846)
 Meridiochorista Lambkin, 1996
 Meridiochorista insolita (Riek, 1973)
 Meridiochorista ruficeps (Newman, 1850)
 Taeniochorista Esben-Petersen, 1914
 Taeniochorista bifurcata Riek, 1973
 Taeniochorista nigrita Riek, 1973
 Taeniochorista pallida Esben-Petersen, 1914
 Taeniochorista similis Riek, 1973

Mecoptera
Insect families
Insects of Australia